Kynan Chenai (born 29 January 1991, in Hyderabad) is an Indian shooter in the Trap discipline. He won the Asia Olympic Shooting qualifiers held in Delhi on 28 January 2016. He competed in the 2016 Summer Olympics, placing 19 in the Men's Trap Event.

Early life

Kynan was born to a reputed Parsi family in Hyderabad, India. His father Darius Chenai is a former national shooting champion in Trap discipline and a businessman. He studied in Hebron School in Ooty, Tamil Nadu with German as elected foreign language. During his school days, he was part of the Field Hockey Team and Football Team, and also the school's freestyle swimming champion for three years.

Athletic career 
In 2003, he took up shooting and was initially coached by his father. Later he was coached by four-time Olympic champion Mansher Singh. He won the gold medal in Junior Men's Trap shooting event at the 50th and the 51st National Shooting Championship in India.
He also won a gold medal in the Trap event in the 2008 Commonwealth Youth Games.

Kynan achieved an Olympic quota for the 2016 Summer Olympics after finishing fourth in the Asia Olympic Shooting qualifiers in Delhi on 28 January 2016, where he finished 19th in the men's trap qualification round.

References

1991 births
Living people
Shooters at the 2016 Summer Olympics
Olympic shooters of India
Parsi people
Shooters at the 2014 Asian Games
Asian Games competitors for India
Indian male sport shooters
21st-century Indian people